Blennidus galapagoensis is a species of ground beetle in the subfamily Pterostichinae. It was described by G.R.Waterhouse in 1845.

References

Blennidus
Beetles described in 1845